Blue Star Productions was a Sun Lakes, Arizona-based publishing imprint of Book World, Inc. of mostly comparative spiritual traditions, mystical, metaphysical, new age, paranormal, ufology, philosophy, non-fiction, and fiction books.

Books
 Barry Brierley, Wasichu's Return, 1996, 
 Richard J Boylan, Star Kids: The Emerging Cosmic Generation, 2005 
 Robert Bryce, A Question of Time, 1995, 
 Barbara B. Carvalle, Lefty, Louie and the Boys, 1993, 
 David E. Caywood and Landi Mellas, The Other Sky: Reclaiming Who We Are and Why We Came Here, 
 Barry Chamish, Return of the Giants, 2000, 
 Rebecca Cramer, Mission to Sonora, 1998, 
 The View from Frog Mountain, 2000, 
 Barbara DeBolt, How To Write A Best Seller In 40 Days OR Less, 
 Shari Dodd, The Emerald of Lastanzia, 
 Rhiannon, 
 Rene Donovan, Me 'n God in the Coffee Shop, 1998, 
 Bruce Goldberg, Time Travelers from our Future, 
 Dezra-Lehr Guthrie (Dezra*), Heart Secrets, 2000, 
 Little Book of Angels,  (and reflections journal)
 Magic Message, 2000, 
 My Magical Friend, 2000, 
 Ocean Messages, 2000, 
 Pocket Psychic: (Tells Your Future Instantly), 2000, 
 Christopher Harding, The Reindeer Boy: A Mystical Journey into the Dreamworld, 1999, 
 Norma Green Hickox, Cataclysms: A New Look at Earth Changes - The Chrysalis Teachings, 1996, 
 Valerie Kirkwood, Shadow of Time, 2000, 
 Laura Leffers, Dance on the Water, 1996, 
 Lisa Iodice, Michael: A Novel, 2000, 
 Diana Nilsen, Where You Live -- Counts!, 1999,  
 Michael Patton, The Raven's Way: A Shamanic Journey into Native American Folklore, 1999, 
 Bridget Pluis, Heaven Waits, 
 Saying Goodbye Is Not Forever, 
 Kelly Rosano, If You Are My Soul Mate...Then Why Am I So Unhappy?, 
 K. Skeffington-Clark, Timshar:  The Mindsounders - Book 1: Abduction, 
 Patricia Telesco, Mirror, Mirror: Reflections of the Sacred Self, 1999, 
 Susanna Thorpe-Clark, Changing The Thoughts, 
 Donald R. Todd, The Antilles Incident, 1997, 
 Charles Wright, The Best Kept Secrets, 1997, 
 (unknown), We Have Watched You . . ., 1994,

References

 Publishers' Catalogues Directory: Book World, Inc., Blue Star Productions at Northern Lights Internet Solutions

External links
 Book World old website (archived on Internet Archive)
 Blue Star Productions old website (archived on Internet Archive)

Small press publishing companies
Paranormal fiction